Mulbarton is a village and civil parish located south of Norwich in the English county of Norfolk.

The place-name 'Mulbarton' is first attested in the Domesday Book of 1086, where it appears as Molkebertuna and Molkebertestuna. The name means "outlying dairy farm", the first element being the Old English 'meoluc' meaning 'milk', and the second element the Old English 'beretun' meaning 'barley town or settlement', hence 'farm'.

The population at the 2001 census was 2,827, increasing to 3,521 at the 2011 census.

Facilities include one school (Mulbarton Primary School), an Adnams' public house, The World's End, a social club, two convenience stores (One Stop and Co-op), a church, a fish-and-chip shop, a Chinese takeaway, and a MOT and vehicle repair centre. There is a regular bus service to Norwich. In the centre of the village is a large common, with a pond where many ducks live.

Governance
An electoral ward in the same name exists. This ward stretches north west to Ketteringham with a total population taken at the 2011 census of 5,121.

Sport
The village also has its own non league football club, Mulbarton Wanderers F.C. who currently play in the Eastern Counties Football League at the Mulberry Park ground.

Notable people
 Maurice Norman, the former Norwich City, Tottenham Hotspur and England footballer, was born in Mulbarton
 Sir Edward Wingfield, a retired civil servant, lived at Mulbarton Hall in the early 1900s.

References

External links

Mulbarton village website
Parish council website
Mulbarton Cricket Club
Mulbarton Primary School
Norfolk Heritage and Explorations - Mulbarton

 
Villages in Norfolk
Civil parishes in Norfolk